Igor Stamenovski (born 16 June 1980) is a former Macedonian professional footballer.

Club career
He made his debut in the Russian Premier League in 2001 for FC Spartak Moscow.

Honours
 Macedonian Prva Liga bronze: 1998.
 Russian Premier League champion: 2001.

References

1980 births
Living people
People from Delčevo
Association football defenders
Macedonian footballers
FK Makedonija Gjorče Petrov players
FK Pelister players
PFC Velbazhd Kyustendil players
FC Spartak Moscow players
FC Baltika Kaliningrad players
Macedonian First Football League players
First Professional Football League (Bulgaria) players
Russian Premier League players
Macedonian expatriate footballers
Expatriate footballers in Bulgaria
Macedonian expatriate sportspeople in Bulgaria
Expatriate footballers in Russia
Macedonian expatriate sportspeople in Russia